Coldham may refer to:

Places
Coldham, Cambridgeshire
Coldham, Staffordshire

Other uses
Coldham (surname)
Coldham Hall, Grade I listed building in Suffolk, England
Coldham Cottage, Roman Catholic church in Suffolk, England